Echo Bay may refer to

United States
 Echo Bay, Nevada
 Echo Bay (Long Island Sound)

Canada
 Echo Bay, British Columbia
 Echo Bay, Ontario
 Echo Bay, Saskatchewan
 Echo Bay Mines
 Port Radium, Northwest Territories